The Chinese Professional Baseball League (CPBL) players have a rich tradition of using nicknames. This is a list of the nicknames used in the CPBL.

Players' nicknames by team
The words in brackets are the pronunciation of Chinese or Taiwanese in Pinyin.

Current teams

CTBC Brothers
 Chang Cheng-wei (張正偉) - Blossom (Huahua)
 Chang Chih-hao (張志豪) - Boiler (Guolu)
 Chang Min-yen (張民諺) - A-ken
 Chen Chiang-ho (陳江和) - Red Turtle (Anggu)
 Huang Shih-hao (黃仕豪) - Big Head (Datou)
 Jan Fu-zhi (簡富智) - Clone (Fuzhiren)
 Li Feng-hua (李風華) - National Father (Guofu)
 Peng Cheng-min (彭政閔) - Chia Chia
 Wang Sheng-wei (王勝偉) - Magneto (Wanciwang)
 Yeh Ting-jen (葉丁仁) - Tinky Winky (Dingding)
 Yeh Yung-chieh (葉詠捷) - Johnnys Yeah (Jienisiyei)
 Chou Ssu-chi (周思齊) - Jay Chou (Zhoudong)

Fubon Guardians
 Chang Chien-ming - Brother Fire (Huoge)
 Chen Chih-wei - Little Overlord (Xiaobawang)
 Chen Huan-yang - Foreign Pitcher (Yangtou)
 Cheng Da-hong - Johnny Dahon
 Cheng Chao-hang - A-run
 Deng Shih-yang - Teacher Deng (Denglaoshi)
 Hsu Kuo-long - Milk (Niunai)
 Lin Chi-wei - Little Princess (Xiaogongzhu)
 Lin Yi-chuan - Boxer (Shenquan)
 Lin Ying-chieh - Three Hairs (Sanmao)
 Shen Fu-jen - Madam (Furen)
 Shen Yu-chieh - Crab (Pangxie)
 Shih Chin-tien - Auntie (Ayi)
 Su Chian-jong - A-zai
 Wu Chung-chun - Winnie Pooh (Weini)
 Yang Chien-fu - A-fu
 Yu hsien-ming - Salu

Rakuten Monkeys
 Chan Zhi-yao - Handsome Chan (Zhanshuai)
 Chang Chia-hao - Red Monkey (Aungao)
 Chen Chin-feng - Chen Chin-homer "the No.1 Slugger in Taiwan, National Hero" (Taiwanfonpao Chen Chin-feng)
 Chung Cheng-yu - Yoyoyo
 Hsu Ming-chieh - X-men
 Huang Chin-chih - Mars (Zhanshen)
 Huang Hao-jan - Poet (Shiren)
 Keng Po-hsuan - Fat Keng (Gengpang)
 Kuo Hsiu-wei - Nano (Naimi)
 Kuo Yen-wen - Mini
 Lin Chih-ping - T-men
 Lin Chih-sheng - Big Brother (Dashixiong)
 Lin Hung-yu - Fatty (Xiaopang)
 Liu Chia-hao - Kill a lot (Shahenda)
 Shih Chih-wei - Little Head (Xiaotou)
 Tseng Hao-ju - Totoro (Longmao)
 Wang Po-jung - The King(Dawang)

Uni-President 7-Eleven Lions
 Chang Chih-chiang - Class President (Banzhang)
 Chang Tai-shan - "Tarzan" the Prince of Jungle (Senlinwangzi)
 Chen Cheng-hsien - Terrorist (Kungbufenzi)
 Chen Chia-wei - Bad Guy (Huairen)
 Chen Chih-feng - Rookie (Xiaobing)
 Chen Chun-hui - Denmark (Danmai)
 Chen Lien-hung - A-lo
 Chen Yi-chen - Sugar Apple (Shijia)
 Chen Yung-chi - Taiwan Bomber (Taiwanhongzhaji)
 Cheng Nai-wen - Brown Huntsman Spider (Laya)
 Cheng Pai-sheng - A-jiu
 Chiang Chen-yen - Chicken Chop (Jipai)
 Chou Kuang-shen - Iron Palm (Tieshazhang)
 Chuang Ching-he - Gei-hsiao-he
 Chu Yuen-chin - Pony (Xiaoma)
 Fu Yu-kang - Bun (Mantou)
 Hsu Feng-pin - Feng-pin Suzuki (Lingmufengbing)
 Hsu Sheng-chieh - Bitter Gourd (Kougui)
 Hsu Yu-wei - Una
 Huang En-tsi - N4
 Huang Chih-lung - Boss (Dua-ei)
 Huang Kan-lin - Cane (Ganzhe)
 Kao Cheng-hua - Ovaltine (Ahuatian)
 Kao Chien-san - Kao Chien-three
 Kao Chih-kang - Prince Chiaki (Qianqiuwangzi)
 Kao Lung-wei - Loca (Leka)
 Kao Kuo-ching - Green Tank (Lusetanke),Taiwan Pujols
 Kuo Chin-hsing - Water (Ashui)
 Kuo Chun-yu - Kuro
 Kuo Dai-chi - Backhoe (Guaishou)
 Lai Chung-kuang - Sogo
 Liao Wen-yang - Absolutely Win (Wenyang)
 Lin Yueh-ping - Big Cake (Dabing)
 Liu Fu-hao - Little Breaking (Xiaopo)
 Liu Yu-cheng - Nakajima (Zhongdao)
 Lo Ching-lung - Kam Shan-chu (Jinshanzhao)
 Lo Kuo-chong - Logo
 Lu Wen-sheng - Peter Pan (Xiaofeixia)
 Pan Chun-jung - Little Panpan (Xiaopanpan)
 Pan Wei-lun - Dudu
 Pan Wu-hsiung - Take (Takei)
 Shen Po-tsang - Drift Shen (Shenpiao)
 Tang Chao-ting - Clipper (Kuaiting)
 Teng Chih-wei - Little Teng Teng (Xiaodengdeng)
 Tsai Ching-hao - Stone (Jiutou)
 Tsai Shihi-chin - Celery (Qincai)
 Tsai Wan-ling - Billionaire (Shoufu)
 Tseng Chih-chen - Big Eye (Damu)
 Tseng Yi-cheng - Little Baby (Xiaobao)
 Tu Fu-ming - Duroyal (Dulaoye)
 Wang Ching-ming - Shanzhai C.M. Wang (Shangzhaiwangjianmin)
 Wang Tzu-sung - Lucky
 Wu Chia-rong - Black Horse (Heima)
 Yang Po-chao - Potato (Tudou)
 Yang Sen- Samba (Senba)
 Yang Sung-hsien - Brother Bo (Baoge)
 Yang Tung-yi - Yangyang
 Yen Chun-hao - Rhino (Xiniu)

Wei Chuan Dragons

Defunct teams

China Times Eagles

Chinatrust Whales

dmedia T-REX

Mercuries Tigers
 Chang Chien-hsun - A-tsai
 Chen Ming-te - Tragic (Beiqing)
 Cheng Hsing-sheng - Shark (Shayu)
 Huang Wu-hsiung - Teacher (Laoshi)
 Kang Ming-shan - A-shan
 Lin Chen-hsien - Mike
 Lin Yi-hung - No. 4 (Xiaosi)
 Tu Hung-chin - Locomotive (Huochetou)
 Weng Fung-yu - The Man From Kinmen (Ginmon)

See also
 Asia Series
 Chinese Professional Baseball League
 CPBL awards
 Gambling in Taiwan
 Professional baseball in Taiwan
 Sports in Taiwan
 Taiwan baseball team
 Taiwan Series

References

External links
 Chinese Professional Baseball League 
 History of the Chinese Professional Baseball League 
 Taiwanese Baseball Primer 

Chinese Professional Baseball League lists
Baseball
CPBL